Omm ol Ghezlan (also Romanized as Omm ol Ghezlān; also known as Āhūvand, Āhvand, Ohmgazlan, Omm-ol Qazlān, and Ommol-qezlān) is a village in Abdoliyeh-ye Gharbi Rural District, in the Central District of Ramshir County, Khuzestan Province, Iran. At the 2006 census, its population was 27, in 6 families.

References 

Populated places in Ramshir County